The Euskotren 950 series is an electric multiple unit (EMU) train type operated by Euskotren in the Basque Country, Spain.

History
In June 2014, Euskotren awarded CAF the construction of 28 3-car EMUs for 150 million euros. They are similar to the earlier 900 series, but feature improved accessibility.

The first trainset was delivered in November 2015. The series entered service on the Txorierri line on July 2, 2016. The series gradually replaced the older 200 and 300 series trains, with the last unit being delivered in 2018. Now, they also run local services between Eibar and Ermua, on the Urdaibai line, and on Bilbao metro line 3.

Interior
Each train has 94 seats, with additional space for 202 standing passengers. Internally, the three cars are connected with open gangways. Wheelchair space is provided at one end of the intermediate car, the doors near it are equipped with ramps. All trains have dedicated spaces for passengers carrying bicycles.

Naming
Each unit is named after a mountain of the Basque Country. The first 17 EMUs have the same names as the electric locomotives operated by Ferrocarriles Vascongados (a historical company that preceded Euskotren).

See also
 Euskotren rolling stock
 Euskotren 900 series – the four-car counterpart of the 950 series

References

External links
 

Electric multiple units of Spain
950 series
CAF multiple units
Train-related introductions in 2016
1500 V DC multiple units